In geometry, Wallis's conical edge is a ruled surface given by the parametric equations
 

Wallis's conical edge is also a kind of right conoid. It is named after the English mathematician John Wallis, who was one of the first to use Cartesian methods to study conic sections.

See also 
 Ruled surface
 Right conoid

References

 A. Gray, E. Abbena, S. Salamon, Modern differential geometry of curves and surfaces with Mathematica, 3rd ed. Boca Raton, Florida:CRC Press, 2006. 

External links
Wallis's Conical Edge from MathWorld.

Surfaces
Geometric shapes